Zhangjiawan Town is a town situated in the north of Tongzhou District,Beijing, China. It shares border with Linheli Subdistrict and Yongshun Town to the north, Lucheng Town to the northeast, Xiji and Kuoxian Towns to the east, Yujiawu Hui Township and Majuqiao Town to the south, Taihu, Liyuan Towns and Wenjing Subdistrict to the west. It was home to 127,992 people in 2020.

During Yuan dynasty, an official named Zhang Xuan (张瑄) was in charge of overseeing transportation through canals. He built a port on the Grand Canal southeast of Khanbaliq, and the region was later named Zhangjiawan

History

Administration divisions 
As of 2021, Zhangjiawan Town oversaw 57 villages:

See also 

 List of township-level divisions of Beijing

References 

Towns in Beijing
Tongzhou District, Beijing